Poynter Hill is a conspicuous hill, height , standing 8 nautical miles (15 km) east-southeast of Cape Kjellman on the west side of Trinity Peninsula. Charted in 1948 by the Falkland Islands Dependencies Survey, it was named by the United Kingdom Antarctic Place-Names Committee in 1950 after Charles William Poynter, master's mate, who accompanied Edward Bransfield on the brig Williams in January 1820 when explorations were made in the South Shetland Islands and Bransfield Strait. Poynter Hill is separated from nearby Ivory Pinnacles by the 700-metre pass Poynter Col, which derived its name from that of the hill.

Map
 Trinity Peninsula. Scale 1:250000 topographic map No. 5697. Institut für Angewandte Geodäsie and British Antarctic Survey, 1996.

References

 SCAR Composite Antarctic Gazetteer.

Hills of Trinity Peninsula